Patrick Percival "Pat" Power (born 11 February 1942 in Cooma, New South Wales) is a retired Australian bishop of the Catholic Church.

Early life
Power grew up in Queanbeyan and was educated at St Christopher's School and St Edmund's College in Canberra and completed his schooling at Chevalier College, Bowral. After leaving school, he trained for the priesthood at St Columba's College in Springwood and St Patrick's College, Manly.

Power was ordained to the priesthood in Queanbeyan on 17 July 1965 and served in the parishes of Braidwood, Canberra and Goulburn before being asked by Archbishop Thomas Cahill to undertake a doctorate in canon law in 1972 at the Propaganda Fide College, Rome. On the completion of his studies in 1975, Power returned to Canberra and for 10 years served as archbishop's secretary (to three archbishops) and director of the marriage tribunal.

In February 1985, Power became parish priest of his home parish of Queanbeyan.

Episcopate
On 18 April 1986, he was consecrated bishop by Archbishop Francis Carroll in St Christopher's Cathedral, Canberra, becoming the fifth Auxiliary Bishop of Canberra–Goulburn.

Since that time he served on bishops' committees for laity, ecumenism, canon law, family and life, social welfare and media.  He has also been the Secretary of the Committee for Justice, Development, Ecology and Peace and a member of the Australian Social Justice Council.

Much of his ministry has been in the field of ecumenical and inter-faith relations. He was the first Catholic co-chairman of AUSTARC, the national Anglican-Roman Catholic dialogue. He served a number of terms as chair of the ACT Churches Council.

At the 1998 Oceania Synod of Bishops in Rome, Power spoke on marginalised people in society and in the church. Much of his efforts have been directed in this area through Catholic Welfare Australia and through local community organizations in Canberra. He has been a strong advocate for the East Timorese and the Palestinian people, for Aboriginal people, for racial respect, for the unemployed and in opposition to abortion and assisted suicide.

In 2000, Power chaired a major enquiry into poverty in the Australian Capital Territory. He supported the move to have the South Sydney Rabbitohs restored to the national rugby league competition.

Power has said that the church has "retreated from the promising outcomes" of the Second Vatican Council.  In a 2010 article, he said that issues such as priestly celibacy, church teaching on sexuality and the role of women in the church must be discussed with Catholic lay people. He often expressed support for the ordination of married men.

His early resignation, at age 70, as auxiliary bishop of Canberra and Goulburn was effective from 7 June 2012.  He stated that the Vatican's "inability to listen" and the problems of clergy sex abuse and the shortage of priests are the "most vexing issues" facing the church.

External links
 Australian Catholic Directory

References

1942 births
Living people
Australian people of Irish descent
People from New South Wales
Roman Catholic archbishops of Canberra and Goulburn
20th-century Roman Catholic bishops in Australia
21st-century Roman Catholic bishops in Australia
20th-century Roman Catholic titular bishops